Home, Sweet Home is a 1933 British drama film directed by George A. Cooper and starring John Stuart, Marie Ney and Richard Cooper. It was made at Twickenham Studios as a quota quickie for release by RKO Pictures.

Cast
  John Stuart as Richard Pelham 
 Marie Ney  as Constance Pelham 
 Richard Cooper as Tuprnan 
 Sydney Fairbrother  as Mrs. Bagshow 
 Cyril Raymond  as John Falkirk 
 Eve Becke as Betty Marlin 
 Eliot Makeham  as James Merrick 
 Felix Aylmer as Robert Wilding KC 
 Ben Welden  as Santos
 Joan Carter
 Barbara Everest

References

Bibliography
 Low, Rachael. Filmmaking in 1930s Britain. George Allen & Unwin, 1985.
 Wood, Linda. British Films, 1927–1939. British Film Institute, 1986.

External links
 

1933 films
British drama films
1933 drama films
Films directed by George A. Cooper
Quota quickies
Films set in England
Films shot at Twickenham Film Studios
British black-and-white films
1930s English-language films
1930s British films